Liverpool B.C. are a basketball club from the city of Liverpool, England. 

The Men's first team compete in the English Basketball League Division 3 North West league, and the club have youth teams competing in the U18, U16 and U14 Regional Divisions.  They play their home games at the Archbishop Beck Catholic Sports College.

History
The club was founded by Jimmy Rogers and Tim Martyn-Jones as a Junior section to the local YMCA basketball team, playing under the name 'Atac' to reflect the flowing, attacking style of basketball they aimed for the team to play.  The team became independent in 1973 and moved to play their home games at the local Riversdale College, changing their name to Riversdale Atac to reflect their new home base.  The club then competed in the local Merseyside League and the North West Counties League for many years before turning their eyes towards national level competition.

In the late 1980s, the club sought to expand their reach in the community as a precursor to entering the National League, moving their home games to the more suitable Everton Park Sports Centre and renaming themselves Liverpool Atac to attract players from a wider area.  As part of their preparations, the club also started to compete in the National Founders Cup, and came up just short of carving their name onto the non-league trophy in 1991 and 1992, finishing as runners-up in both seasons.  The club then entered NBL Division 3 for the 1992/1993 season, earning promotion to Division 2 in their first season.  Three years later, a third-place finish was enough to secure a place in NBL Division 1 for the 1996/1997 season, but the retirement of a number of senior players meant that their stay in the top English division was brief, lasting only a single season.

After several more years in EBL Division 2, the club moved to the newly constructed Greenbank Sports Academy in the early 2000s, which coincided with a re-organisation of the English league.  This saw the club awarded a place in the new NBL Division 1 (now forming the tier below the NBL Conference), but once again the club struggled to maintain their position in the league, finishing bottom in consecutive seasons.  The club were reprieved after the 2000/2001 season due to the league's expansion, but they were relegated to NBL Division 2 (North) following their last-place finish in 2001/2002.  The club then went the 2002/2003 season unbeaten on their way to a league and playoff double to earn promotion to the second English tier again, just in time for a second league restructure in five years to see the division rebranded as EBL Division 2.

Arguably the club's highest honour to date was to follow in 2005/2006, as they lifted the Patrons Cup following a thrilling 85–83 overtime win over the West Hertfordshire Warriors at the Amaechi Basketball Centre.  However, another exodus of experienced players to the newly formed Mersey Tigers saw the club finish bottom in EBL Division 2 in 2006/2007, and then finish bottom again in EBL Division 3 in 2007/2008 to suffer back-to-back relegations and end in the bottom tier of national competition.  The club's strong development base enabled them to survive without dropping back to the regional leagues, but they struggled badly for several years, generally finishing in the lower reaches of EBL Division 4 (North).

A move to the Archbishop Beck Catholic Sports College and a new coach in the 2013/2014 season saw the club's fortunes finally turn for the better, winning promotion with an unbeaten campaign that took in the league and playoff titles.  A second success was to follow immediately after, as they won another league and playoff double in their first season back in EBL Division 3, returning to EBL Division 2 for the 2015/2016 season. They struggled in their first season in Division 2, finishing in 7th place, but had a very successful playoff campaign, becoming Division 2 playoff champions in 2016 by defeating Solent Kestrels in the playoff final at the new Basketball Performance Centre in Manchester.

Honours
NBL Division 2 (North) League Champions
 2003
NBL Division 2 Playoff Champions
 2003
Patrons Cup
 2006
EBL Division 4 (North) League Champions
 2014
EBL Division 4 Playoff Champions
 2014
EBL Division 3 (North) League Champions
 2015
EBL Division 3 Playoff Champions
 2015
EBL Division 2 Playoff Champions
 2016

EBL Division 2 League Champions

2019

EBL Division 2 Playoff Champions

2019

Season-by-season records

References

External links
Official Liverpool Basketball Club website

Basketball teams in England
Sports organisations based in Liverpool
Sports clubs founded by the YMCA